The Nantan meteorite is an iron meteorite that belongs to the  IAB group and the MG (main group) subgroup.

In 2000, pieces of the meteorite were included in an art installation for The BullRing Shopping Centre in Birmingham, England. A plaque now commemorates the occasion. 

, pieces of Nantan meteorite were on sale at /g.

Discovery
The fall of the meteorite might have been observed in 1516, but it is difficult to assess if this event is connected with the pieces that were retrieved in 1958.

The meteorite was named after the city.

The fragments were not retrieved until the 1950s when they were gathered for smelting to make metal for the growing industrialization of China. It was found that the meteoric iron contained too much nickel for smelting.

Description and Classification
Most fragments show strong signs of weathering, due to the long time it took to retrieve them. The meteoric iron has a Nickel concentration of 6.96%.

References

Meteorites found in China
Iron meteorites